Sida crystallina is a species of ctenopod in the family Sididae. It is found in Europe.

Subspecies
These two subspecies belong to the species Sida crystallina:
 Sida crystallina americana Korovchinsky, 1979
 Sida crystallina crystallina (O. F. Müller, 1776)

References

Further reading

 

Cladocera
Articles created by Qbugbot
Crustaceans described in 1776
Taxa named by Otto Friedrich Müller